This is a list of career statistics of Canadian tennis player Bianca Andreescu. To date, she has won three WTA singles titles, including one major title, one Premier Mandatory and one Premier 5.

Performance timelines

Only main-draw results in WTA Tour, Grand Slam tournaments, Fed Cup/Billie Jean King Cup and Olympic Games are included in win–loss records.

Singles
Current through the 2023 Dubai Open.

Doubles

Significant finals

Grand Slam tournament finals

Singles: 1 (1 title)

WTA 1000 finals

Singles: 3 (2 titles, 1 runner-up)

WTA career finals

Singles: 6 (3 titles, 3 runner-ups)

Doubles: 1 (1 runner-up)

WTA 125 tournament finals

Singles: 1 (1 title)

ITF Circuit finals

Singles: 9 (5 titles, 4 runner-ups)

Doubles: 4 (3 titles, 1 runner-up)

Junior Grand Slam finals

Doubles: 2 (2 titles)

WTA Tour career earnings
current as of 23 May 2022

Career Grand Slam statistics

Seedings
The tournaments won by Andreescu are in boldface, and advanced into finals are in italics.

Best Grand Slam tournament results details

Head-to-head records

Record against top 10 players
Andreescu's record against players who have been ranked in the top 10. Active players are in boldface.

Top 10 wins
Andreescu has a 10–7 record against players who were, at the time the match was played, ranked in the top 10.

Longest winning streaks

17 match win streak (2019)

Notes

References

External links
 
 
 

Tennis career statistics